Rossomyrmex minuchae is a species of slave-making ant in the subfamily Formicinae. It is native to Spain.

References

External links

Formicinae
Hymenoptera of Europe
Slave-making ants
Insects described in 1981
Taxonomy articles created by Polbot